As of 31 December 2016, Turkish population is 79,814,871 of which 23.7% are between 0-14, 68% are between 15-64 and 8.3% are older than 65 years old. Life expectancy at birth for men is 75.3 and for women is 80.7 years. Maternal mortality ratio has decreased from 23 to 16 per 100,000 live births between the years 2010 to 2015. According to the data from 2015, Under-five mortality and infant mortality rates per 1000 live births are 13.5 and 11.6.

The Human Rights Measurement Initiative finds that Turkey is fulfilling 81.6% of what it should be fulfilling for the right to health based on its level of income. When looking at the right to health with respect to children, Turkey achieves 95.5% of what is expected based on its current income. In regards to the right to health amongst the adult population, the country achieves only 92.0% of what is expected based on the nation's level of income.  Turkey falls into the "very bad" category when evaluating the right to reproductive health because the nation is fulfilling only 57.3% of what the nation is expected to achieve based on the resources (income) it has available.

Turkish Health System 

Health services in Turkey are controlled by the Ministry of Health through a centralized state system. In 2003, the government introduced a comprehensive health reform program aimed at increasing the budget rate allocated to healthcare services and ensuring that a large part of the population is healthy. The Turkish Statistical Institute announced that it had spent 76.3 billion TL in health services in 2012; the Social Security Institution covered 79.6% of the service fees while the remaining 15.4% were paid directly by the patients." According to 2013 figures, there are 30,116 health institutions in Turkey and per one doctor there are an average of 573 patients. In addition, the number of beds per 1000 people is 2.64. Life expectancy in Turkey is 71.1 years for males and 75.2 years for females, and the life expectancy of the total population is 73.2 years. The three most common causes of mortality in the country are circulatory system diseases (39.8%), cancer (21.3%), respiratory diseases (9.8%).

Healthcare in Turkey is majorly provided by Ministry of Health and some private health institutions. In 2003 with the Health Transformation Programme, the social security system is converged and now called 'The General Health Insurance Scheme'.

Primary Healthcare System 
The Turkish Public Health Association is accountable for the primary healthcare delivery in Turkey.

Services that are managed, developed and supervised by the Public Health Association are (health related units) :

Primary Health Care Services 
Supervising the Family Medicine Unit (which consists of a Family Physician and a health personnel) and General Practitioners
Immigration Healthcare Services

Communicable Diseases Control Programmes 
Early warning-response field epidemiology unit
Communicable Diseases Unit
Preventable diseases -Vaccination Unit
Vector-borne and Zoonotic Diseases Unit
Tuberculosis Unit
Microbiology Laboratories Unit

Non-communicable Diseases Programmes and Cancer 
Tobacco and other addictive substances campaign Unit
Cancer Unit
Mental Health Programmes Unit
Obesity, Diabetes, Other Metabolic Diseases Unit
Chronic Diseases, Elderly and Disabled Unit
Women and Reproductive Health unit
Child and Adolescent Health Unit

Occupational Safety and Environmental Health Unit

Public Health Laboratory

Maternal Mortality Ratio (MMR) 

According to the WHO data between the years 1990 to 2015, Maternal Mortality Ratio in Turkey has decreased from 57 to 16 in 10 years. In 2010, Turkey was nearly on par with some of the other OECD countries such as South Korea and Hungary and had a lower maternal mortality ratio than United States.

Under-five Mortality Rate (U5MR) 
Turkey's U5MR in 2007 has reduced by 72% over 1990 levels, while in the world the total reduction was %26.9 between 1990 and 2007. In 2010, U5MR in Turkey was highest compared to other OECD countries.

Causes of death
In 2013 the top 5 causes of death were circulatory diseases (39,8%),  cancer (21,3%), respiratory diseases (9.8%), endocrine and nutritional diseases (5,6%), external causes (5,5%) and nervous system diseases (4.1%). When the diseases causing death are examined on a gender basis; deaths from circulatory and endocrine diseases were found mostly in women and deaths from cancers and external causes were seen in men."

The first three ranks of deaths did not change in 2016.

NCDs already account for over 70 percent of all mortality in Turkey. Reported mortality from coronary heart disease (CHD) amongst Turkish women is the highest in Europe. Despite the public health programmes already in place, risk factor levels for NCDs are high in Turkey. Clinically significant hypertension exists in at least a third of the adult Turkish population.

Top ten causes of deaths in 2016 from the most frequent to the least are;
Ischemic Heart Disease
Cerebrovascular Disease
Alzheimer Disease
COPD
Lung Cancer
Diabetes
Chronic Kidney Disease
Road Injuries
Hypertensive Heart Disease
Lower respiratory infections

WHO estimates that 42% of men are tobacco smokers. One in 5 adults is obese and just under a quarter of adults have hypertension.

'Multisectoral action plan of Turkey for non-communicable diseases 2017–2025' has been established by the Turkish Ministry of Health in order to halt and manage the NCDs in Turkey. The action plan is coordinated with the Sustainable Development Goals.

Air pollution and climate change

Air pollution in Turkey is estimated to be a cause of 8% of deaths in 2019. Coal is a major contributor to air pollution, and damages health across the nation, being burnt even in homes and cities. It is estimated that a phase out of coal power in Turkey by 2030 instead of by the 2050s would save over 100 thousand lives. Climate change in Turkey may impact health, for example due to increased heatwaves.

Vaccine-preventable Diseases 

Vaccines that are on the existing immunization schedule of the government are free of charge.

According to the recent 'WHO vaccine-preventable diseases: monitoring system' reported cases for Diphtheria were 0, Measles were 9, Rubella were 7, Mumps were 544 and Tetanus(total) were 16 cases in 2016.

Immunization Schedule 
HepB_pediatric : birth;1, 6 months
BCG : 2 months
DTaPHibIPV : 2,4,6,18 months
Pneumo_conj : 2,4,6,12 months
MMR :12 months, 6 years
TdaPIPV : 6 years
OPV : 6, 18 months
Td : 14 years
HepA_pediatric : 18,24 months
Varicella : 12 months
Influenza_Adult : >=65 years
Influenza - Pediatric : 6 months

Diabetes

Diabetes causes 2% of total deaths in all ages in Turkey. Furthermore many more Turks die from Diabetic Kidney disease, a complication of Diabetes and non-diabetic High blood sugar, and some say that the consequences of Diabetes could cause up to 20% of all deaths in Turkey.

In 2016 it was estimated that 13.2% of the population had diabetes and there is an increasing trend in the prevalence of diabetes. The main cause of this could be the fact that over Nearly 2 in 3 Turks are overweight and that 1 in 3 are obese.

Diabetes has been described as “one of the top priorities” for the Turkish government. An operational action plan for diabetes, overweight and obesity exists as a national response to the diabetes.

Obesity
The Ministry of Health considers Obesity as having a Body mass index of over 30 (30 kg per 1 meter² of height). In 2016, 66.1% of the population was overweight and 29.4% was obese. The occurrence of diabetes is higher among women than men.   Turkey had the highest rate of obesity in Europe in 2015.

Obesity and being overweight is higher among women for several reasons. A majority of women do not have jobs outside of the home and lead more sedentary lifestyles as a result. Housework is often the only source of physical activity for women, as there is no prior tradition of women participating in sports. Individuals living in urban areas are more likely to be overweight or obese because of the availability of public transportation and the sedentary lifestyle.  A lack of knowledge about health and the health consequences also contribute to the high percentage of excessive weight.

HIV/AIDS in Turkey

Between 2006 and 2017, new HIV infections increased by 465%. AIDS is a disease that is not decreasing as in much of the rest of the world. Analysis of nearly 7000 cases reveal data about HIV in Turkey. AIDS in Turkey is often described as a "Gay disease", "African disease", or "Natasha disease", so people tend to hide their illness. "According to the United Nations HIV / AIDS Theme Group's 2002 HIV / AIDS Situation Analysis report in Turkey, between 7,000 and 14,000 people have been infected with AIDS since the beginning of the pandemic. Figures released by the (Ministry of Health) in June 2002 show that a total of 1,429 HIV / AIDS cases had been reported since 1985." Due to problems in the registration and notification system, obtaining reliable numerical information about AIDS cases is very difficult in Turkey.

"The disease is seen in 20-45 groups. It is estimated that approximately 2,000 people have been treated with this disease in Turkey. Marmara region where the most case report is made to the current. These are followed by Ankara, Izmir, Antalya, Mersin, Adana and Bursa respectively. Foreign nationals who make up about 16 percent of cases are from Ukraine, Moldova and Romania."

2009 swine flu pandemic in Turkey
The 2009 flu pandemic was a global outbreak of a new strain of influenza A virus subtype H1N1, first identified in April 2009, termed Pandemic H1N1/09 virus by the World Health Organization (WHO) and colloquially called swine flu. The outbreak was first observed in Mexico, and quickly spread globally. On 11 June 2009, WHO declared the outbreak to be a pandemic. The overwhelming majority of patients experience mild symptoms", but some persons are in higher risk groups, such as those with asthma, diabetes, obesity, heart disease, or who are pregnant or have a weakened immune system. In the rare severe cases, around 3–5 days after symptoms manifest, the sufferer's condition declines quickly, often to the point respiratory failure.

The virus reached Turkey in May 2009. A U.S. citizen, flying from the United States via Amsterdam was found to be suffering from the swine flu after arriving at Istanbul's Atatürk International Airport. Turkey is the 17th country in Europe and the 36th country in the world to report an incident of swine flu.

The Turkish Government has taken measures at the international airports, using thermal imaging cameras to check passengers coming from international destinations.

The first case of person to person transmission within Turkey was announced on 26 July 2009.

On 2 November, the Turkish Health Ministry began administering vaccines against H1N1 influenza, starting with health workers.

After a slow start, the virus spread rapidly in Turkey and the number of cases reached 12,316. First death confirmed on 24 October and death toll reached 627.

COVID-19 pandemic in Turkey

The COVID-19 pandemic in Turkey is part of the ongoing pandemic of coronavirus disease 2019 caused by severe acute respiratory syndrome coronavirus 2. The disease was confirmed to have reached Turkey on 11 March 2020, after a man who had returned to Turkey from Europe, tested positive. The first death due to COVID-19 in the country occurred on 15 March 2020 and by 1 April, it was confirmed that COVID-19 had spread all over Turkey. On 14 April 2020, the head of the Turkish Ministry of Health Fahrettin Koca announced that the spread of the virus in Turkey has reached its peak in the fourth week and started to slow down. The disease is exacerbated by air pollution, for example from burning coal in Turkey for residential heating.

, the total number of confirmed cases in the country is over  222,400. Among these cases, 205,200 have recovered and 5,500 have died. On 18 April 2020, the total number of positive test results surpassed that of Iran, making it the highest in the Middle East. Turkey also surpassed China in confirmed total cases on 20 April 2020. The rapid increase of the confirmed cases in Turkey did not overburden the public healthcare system, and the preliminary case-fatality rate remained lower compared to many European countries. Discussions mainly attributed these to the country's relatively young population and high number of available intensive care units.

See also
 Health care in Turkey
 Smoking in Turkey

References